The Banisilan–Guiling–Alamada–Libungan Road is a , two-lane secondary highway that connects the provinces of North Cotabato, Lanao del Sur, and Bukidnon. The road also connects Libungan, Cotabato to the Davao–Cotabato Road and leads to Asik-Asik Falls in Alamada, Cotabato.

The highway forms part of National Route 944 (N944) of the Philippine highway network.

References 

Roads in Cotabato
Roads in Lanao del Sur
Roads in Bukidnon